Thom Welby is an American politician and broadcaster. A Democrat, he served as a member of the Pennsylvania House of Representatives for the 113th district from 2021 until 2022.

Career 
Before working for Marty Flynn, Thom Welby worked in both radio and television broadcasting. In 2013, he started working for Flynn. When Flynn was elected to the Pennsylvania State Senate in a special election early in 2021, Welby decided to run for his now-vacant seat in the Pennsylvania State House. He handily defeated Republican Challenger Dominick Manetti in the Special Election on November 2, 2021, and was sworn in on November 17 of the same year.

Welby currently sits on the Game & Fisheries and Liquor Control committees.

Welby had declined to run for a full term, opting solely to finish Flynn's unexpired term. He was succeeded by Kyle Donahue.

References

Year of birth missing (living people)
Living people
Democratic Party members of the Pennsylvania House of Representatives
21st-century American politicians